Hans-Adam Otto von Heydebreck, called Peter von Heydebreck (1 July 1889, in Köslin – 30 June 1934, in Stadelheim Prison) was a German Freikorps- and SA leader, member of the Reichstag and a Nazi. Heydebreck served as an officer in the German Army in World War I. During the German revolution of November 1918, he founded the Freikorps named after him.

During the Third Silesian Uprising in 1921, his troops were foremost in the reconquest of the low mountain at the centre of the Battle of Annaberg, gaining for Von Heydebreck the epithet "the Hero of Annaberg".

He made a career for himself in the Nazi party, but, during the Röhm-Putsch in 1934, he was brought to Stadelheim Prison and was executed with five other SA men by an SS firing squad, becoming one of the victims of the Night of the Long Knives. The renaming was only reverted in 1945; the Nazis kept the name despite the fact that he was a victim of the regime. In 1957, Sepp Dietrich was sentenced to 18 months in prison for convening the firing squad that executed Heydebreck and the others.

External links
 
 Porträt und Biographie im Handbuch des Reichstages
 Peter von Heydebreck in den 

1889 births
1934 deaths
People from Koszalin
People from the Province of Pomerania
German Protestants
German Völkisch Freedom Party politicians
National Socialist Freedom Movement politicians
Nazi Party politicians
20th-century Freikorps personnel
German Army personnel of World War I
Victims of the Night of the Long Knives
Members of the Reichstag of the Weimar Republic
Members of the Reichstag of Nazi Germany
Prussian Army personnel
German nationalists
Nazis executed by Nazi Germany
Nazis executed by firing squad
People executed by Nazi Germany by firing squad